Lord Watson can refer to:
 William Watson, Baron Watson (1827–1899)
 Mike Watson, Baron Watson of Invergowrie (born 1949)
 Alan Watson, Baron Watson of Richmond (born 1941)